Potamotherium ('river beast') an extinct genus of caniform carnivoran from the Miocene epoch of France and Germany. It has been previously assigned to the mustelid family, but recent work suggests that it represents a primitive relative of pinnipeds.

Classification
 
The genus was first described in 1833. Carroll (1988) assigned it to the family Mustelidae as a member of the subfamily Oligobuninae. However, it was recently suggested that Potamotherium was not a mustelid at all, but rather a very basal pinniped. Berta et al. (2018) placed Potamotherium along with Puijila and Semantor in the family Semantoridae.

Two species have been identified in the genus: P. valletoni, the type species, and P. miocenicum.

Distribution
 
Finds range from the mid-latitudes of Europe and North America, dated from the Oligocene/Miocene boundary and surviving through to the end of the Miocene. It has been interpreted by several researchers as a basal, non-marine ancestor of seals and sea lions, suggesting a freshwater phase in the evolutionary transition of pinnipeds from land to sea. If Potamotherium was indeed a pinniped instead of a mustelid, its relatives were possibly early bears (whose ancestors at the time were small and generally weasel-like).

Palaeoecology
With a flexible backbone and a streamlined shape, it was probably a good swimmer. Analysis of fossils suggests that Potamotherium had a poor sense of smell, but made up for this with good vision and hearing.

References

Miocene pinnipeds
Miocene mammals of North America
Aquitanian genus first appearances
Tortonian extinctions
Prehistoric pinnipeds of North America
Miocene mammals of Europe
Fossil taxa described in 1833
Prehistoric carnivoran genera